Nevada City is an unincorporated community in Madison County, Montana, United States. In the 1880s, it was one of the two major centers of Commerce in what was known as one of the "Richest Gold Strikes in the Rocky Mountain West", sharing this role with its sister city Virginia City. Since the late 1990s, Nevada City has become a tourist attraction for its collection of 19th century buildings within or surrounding the Nevada City Museum & Music Hall.

History 
Archaeological evidence found between the Music Hall and the Nevada City Hotel would indicate earlier than mining era habitation, possibly by white hunters or trappers. The earliest white hunters and trappers in the area had no conscious intention of establishing a city on the site, because the existence of a city would have presumably destroyed their economic base, which was based on the harvesting of beaver.

Nevada City, settled June 6, 1863, contemporary in settlement with Virginia City, as miners following the Fairweather party settled the length of Alder Gulch, and established homes, and businesses in convenient locations, the length of the gulch was known as 14 mile city.   Nevada City was the first to become an incorporated city, on February 9, 1865, fully constituted a body corporate and politic.  During the selection of Territorial Capitol Nevada City was considered with Bannack, and Virginia City for that distinction. The early city limits of Nevada City started 400 feet west of W. R. Lockwood’s house in Central City then went south ½ mile, West 1 ¾ mile, and then south to the place of beginning. (Leeson's History of Montana 1735–1885). Many of the early inhabitants moved on to other sites. In 1896, the Conrey Placer Mining Company was organized to dredge the gulch for the next 24 years, destroying many of Nevada City’s buildings. The dredges were then disassembled and the heavy wooden barges were left to slowly be reclaimed by nature. Other original Nevada City buildings were destroyed when the highway was built through the area. Over the years 14 original structures were preserved and remain in Nevada City, the majority of the buildings present today, were moved into the Nevada City Street plan by Charlie Bovey, of Bovey Restorations, the heir to the General Mills fortune (Blumenthal 2). Forrest "Scotty" Zion of the Great Falls business, Zion Construction and Housemoving, was a close friend of the Bovey's and moved the buildings from various locations. Restoration started in the 1950s, following his purchase of the property from the Stiles family.

Present day
Today, the town is managed by the Montana Heritage Commission, Department of Commerce, State of Montana. Businesses in the town are Alder Gulch Accommodations, Nevada City Hotel and Cabins, Just an Experience Bed and Breakfast, The Star Bakery, and the Nevada City Hotel Coffee Shop. Some of the businesses are operational year round, others are operational during the summer season. The town has been restored as an outdoor living history historical museum, linked by railroad to the Virginia City Historic District with numerous historic buildings, artifacts, and furnishings. It is owned by the State of Montana and operated by the Montana Heritage Commission, with 108 historic buildings from various places around Montana, 14 original Nevada City structures.

Nevada CIty is also home to North America’s largest collection of automated music machines which can be found in the Nevada City Music Hall (“Nevada City.”). The Bovey’s have been collecting the machines since 1940 and many of the machines are in excellent working condition (“Nevada City.”).

Structures and inhabitants
The town consists of an open-air museum that includes 108 buildings, 14 buildings are original to the town site. Nevada City was populated by placer miners working several mining districts including Browns Gulch just south of the town and Granite Creek, about two miles northwest of Nevada City. Nevada City was occupied by residents as early as June 6, 1863, and its boom era was between 1863–1875, at this point it was boasted that Nevada City was home to dozens of stores and housing that stretched for six blocks (“Nevada City.”). By 1869, the population of the mining camp had fallen to about 100 people. In 1869 mercantile representation included three general stores, and two saloons. In April 1872, the city contained one miners' store, one brewery, blacksmith shop, butcher shop, livery stable, and a Masonic Hall. Most of the citizens were engaged in mining pursuits, but some of the residents had farms and stock in the valley (Leeson 1885:783). In 1875 Nevada City's Population was still in decline, by 1880 the Nevada City census listed 50 people occupying 16 dwellings (US Census 1880). The most commonly listed occupation of Nevada City's working class was "placer miner."

Famous Trials
On December 19, 1863 a miners' court trial took place. The trial was for the murder of Nicholas, a Dutchman. George Ives was convicted and in less than an hour he was hanged in the middle of town while nearly 2,000 residents watched (“Nevada City, Montana.”).

Gold 
According to Blumenthal, when the mining had come to an end in 1922, about $2.5 billion worth of gold in today's market had been extracted (Blumenthal 2).

Geography 
Nevada City is approximately 27 miles southeast of Twin Bridges on Montana Highway 287. The town site is located 1½ miles west of Virginia City.

References

External links 
  Nevada City – Outdoor History Museum
 Where The West Was Lurid
 Montana Heritage Commission

Mining communities in Montana
Towns in Madison County, Montana
Ghost towns in Montana
Montana articles lacking sources